Peter Kraus (born 27 June 1941 in Rüsselsheim) is a former field hockey player from Germany, who was a member of the West German squad that won the gold medal at the 1972 Summer Olympics in Munich.

External links
 
 Peter Kraus's profile at Sports Reference.com

1941 births
Living people
German male field hockey players
Olympic field hockey players of West Germany
Field hockey players at the 1972 Summer Olympics
Olympic medalists in field hockey
Olympic gold medalists for West Germany
Medalists at the 1972 Summer Olympics
People from Rüsselsheim
Sportspeople from Darmstadt (region)
20th-century German people